The Night of the Dead is a whole night of horror films shown as part of the annual Leeds International Film Festival. Beginning in 2001, it has become a firm fan favourite, selling out well before the event. Since Night of the Dead V, this event has taken place at the Hyde Park Picture House in Leeds, England.

As well as the films there is plenty of banter between films between the "organisers" and the audience. There is the giving away of prizes either for doing, not doing or claiming to have done things that those running the event deem worthy. There is also often an appearance by somebody involved with the making of one of the films shown for a Q&A session.

Night of the Dead IV 
This took place from midnight on 6 November 2004. The films shown were I'll See You In My Dreams (a short), Graveyard Alive: A Zombie Nurse in Love, El Ciclo (another short), Monster Man, Una de Zombis and Black Sunday. Night of the Dead IV was the last to take place at the Lounge Cinema.

Night of the Dead V 
Kicking off at midnight of 12 November 2005  with the short film The French Doors, the event continued, alternating between long and short with Loft, Jona/Tomberry, Boy Eats Girl (starring Samantha Mumba), Something Red, Zombie Honeymoon, 12 Hot Women, and finally Gusha No Bindume (or "Hellavator").

Night of the Dead VI 
On the 11th (technically 12th) day of November in 2006, at the stroke of midnight began the sixth annual Night of the Dead. This occasion began its series of alternating shorts and longs with Deadly Tantrum, followed by Unrest, Monsters, Expiry Date, Home Video, Broken, Repose en Paix and Wild Zero.

Night of the Dead VII 
The seventh Night of the Dead took place at the stroke of midnight Saturday 10 November 2007, finishing in the early hours of Sunday morning. The four main features at the event were Storm Warning, End of the Line, Fritt Vilt ("Cold Prey") and Zibahkhana ("Hell's Ground"). Events kicked off as usual with a horror short entitled Still Life (a film with a striking resemblance to the Doctor Who episode Blink), and the audience was treated to a short between each film as well. The last of the shorts, The Fifth, features Sam Lloyd (Ted from Scrubs).

Notes

External links
 'Night of the Dead VII' official site
 A review of "Night of the Dead VI"
 'Cold Prey' official site
 'Endof the Line' official site
 'The Fifth' official site
 'Hell's Ground' official site
 'Jona/Tomberry' official site
 'Still Life' official site
 'Storm Warning' official site

Fantasy and horror film festivals in the United Kingdom
Film festivals in England
2001 establishments in England
Film festivals established in 2001
Festivals in Leeds